George William Shaw (28 July 1913 – 9 January 1966) was an Australian politician. He was a Country Party member of the Australian House of Representatives from 1963 until his death in 1966, representing the electorate of Dawson.

Shaw was born in Rockhampton and was educated at Mackay High School. He was assistant secretary (1933-1935) and secretary (1935-1943) of the Cattle Creek Co-operative Sugar Milling Association, which operated the Cattle Creek Sugar Mill at Finch Hatton. He was then general manager of the large sugar mill at Farleigh from 1943 to 1964 and was credited with undertaking a rebuilding program at the mill after World War II. From 1949, Shaw was the inaugural deputy chairman of Sugar Research Ltd, which established the industry-backed Sugar Research Institute at Mackay. He was also a state government representative on the Mackay Harbour Board from 1961 to 1963.

In 1963, he was elected to the Australian House of Representatives as the Country Party member for Dawson. He suffered a cerebral hemorrhage on 29 December 1965, the closing date for nominations for preselection to recontest his seat, and defeated a preselection challenge while in hospital, but died in the Mater Hospital, Brisbane on 9 January. He was cremated at the Mount Thompson Crematorium. In the resulting by-election, Dawson was won by Labor for the first time.

References

National Party of Australia members of the Parliament of Australia
Members of the Australian House of Representatives for Dawson
Members of the Australian House of Representatives
1913 births
1966 deaths
20th-century Australian politicians